This is a list of crop plants pollinated by bees along with how much crop yield is improved by bee pollination. Most of them are pollinated in whole or part by honey bees and by the crop's natural pollinators such as bumblebees, orchard bees, squash bees, and solitary bees. Where the same plants have non-bee pollinators such as birds or other insects like flies, these are also indicated.

Pollination by insects is called entomophily.  Entomophily is a form of plant pollination whereby pollen is distributed by insects, particularly bees, Lepidoptera (butterflies and moths), flies and beetles. Honey bees pollinate many plant species that are not native to their natural habitat but are often inefficient pollinators of such plants; if they are visiting ten different species of flower, only a tenth of the pollen they carry may be the right species.  Other bees tend to favor one species at a time, therefore do most of the actual pollination. 

Most staple food grains, like corn, wheat, rice, soybean and sorghum, need no insect help at all; they are wind or self-pollinated. Other staple food crops, like bananas and plantains, are propagated from cuttings, and produce fruit without pollination (parthenocarpy). Further, foods such as root vegetables and leafy vegetables will produce a useful food crop without pollination, though pollination may be required for the purpose of seed production or breeding.

See also 
Fruit tree pollination
Pollination management
Pollinator
Pollen source
List of Northern American nectar sources for honey bees
Forage (honey bee)
List of honey plants
Buckwheat

References

Pollination Mid-Atlantic Apicultural Research and Extension Consortium, MAAREC Publication 5.2; February 2000
Pollination and Bee Plants, Excerpted from Beekeeper's Handbook, Sammataro/Avitabile ©1998.

Further reading
Krombein KV, Hurd PD Jr., Smith DR (eds.). Catalog of Hymenoptera in America North of Mexico, Volume 3, Smithsonian Institution Press, 1979
McGregor, S.E. Insect Pollination Of Cultivated Crop Plants USDA, 1976

Crop plant pollination

Agriculture-related lists
Beekeeping
crops, bees
crops, bees
Gardening lists
Vegetables
Insects in culture
Pollination